Ballomar or Ballomarios (AD 140 – AD 170-180) was a leader of the Marcomanni during the Marcomannic Wars.

The name "Ballomar" can be broken down into two Celtic elements, ballo- meaning "limb, member" (cf. Gaulish ballos Irish ball), and maro meaning "great" (cf. Gaulish maros, Welsh mawr, Irish mór).;;

Ballomar is first mentioned by Cassius Dio as conducting peace talks with the governor of Pannonia Superior, Marcus Jallius Bassus, following the breakthrough of the limes by his allies the Germanic Lombards and Ubii. Ballomar led the great invasion of Italy by a coalition of Celtic and Germanic tribes in 167-70 AD, which was the first time a hostile force had entered Italy since the Cimbri of Boiorix during the Cimbrian War. Ballomar defeated a force of 20,000 Roman soldiers near Carnuntum, destroyed Opitergium (Oderzo) and besieged Aquilea.

Ballomar might be the character on episode XXV on the Column of Marcus Aurelius, who surrenders on behalf of the Marcomannic to Marcus Aurelius. The dating of this episode is around 172 AD.

In fiction

Ballomar is a character in the 1964 film The Fall of the Roman Empire.

Sources
 Cassius Dio, Historia romana, Books LXXII & LXXIII
 The column of Marcus Aurelius in Rome, which apparently depicts Ballomar

References

Marcomannic people
140 births
2nd-century deaths
2nd-century people